The molecular formula C14H22N2O (molar mass: 234.34 g/mol, exact mass: 234.1732 u) may refer to:

 Lidocaine, or lignocaine
 Ispronicline (TC-1734, AZD-3480)

Molecular formulas